The Ring of Destiny is a 1915 American Western film, directed by and starring Cleo Madison.

Cast
 Cleo Madison
 Joe King
 Hoot Gibson
 William Steele as William Gettinger

See also
 Hoot Gibson filmography

External links
 

1915 films
1915 Western (genre) films
1915 short films
American silent short films
American black-and-white films
Silent American Western (genre) films
1910s American films